Marianne Beate Kielland, (born October 12, 1975 in Lørenskog, Norway) is a Norwegian mezzo-soprano. In 2009, she was awarded the Nordlysprisen.

Recordings 
Veslemøy synsk (Song cycle by Olav Anton Thommessen) (2011) - Nils Anders Mortensen piano. The cycle is based on the text Haugtussa by the Norwegian poet Arne Garborg.
Händel cantatas for solo alto (2010) - Bergen Barokk
Come away death (Songs by Korngold, Plagge, Sibelius, Ratkje, Finzi og Mussorgsky) (2009) - Sergei Osadchuk
J. S. Bach: Vergnügte Pleißenstadt, BWV 216 (2005) - Osaka Bach Ensemble/Joshua Rifkin
J. S. Bach: Matthew Passion (2006) - Dresdner Kammerchor/Kölner Kammerorchester/Helmut Müller-Brühl
J. S. Bach: Alto solo cantatas BWV 35, 54, 169, 170 and 200 (2005) - Kölner Kammerorchester/Helmut Müller-Brühl
J. S. Bach: Alto solo cantata BWV 35 (2005) - Kölner Kammerorchester/Helmut Müller-Brühl
J. S. Bach: Messe in h-moll BWV 232 (2004) - Kölner Kammerorchester/Dresdner Kammerorchester/Helmut Müller-Brühl
Vivaldi: Gloria, Kyrie (2004) - Nidarosdomens jentekor/Norsk Barokkorkester/Edward Higginsbottom
Ragnar Bjerkreim: Kong David (2004) Oratorie Kor Z
J. S. Bach - Markuspasjonen (2003) - Norsk Barokkorkester/Edward Higginsbottom
Alf Hurum: Fandango - Complete Songs with Piano (2003) - Øyvind Aase

External links 
Marianne Beate Kielland's web site
Short biography at bach-cantatas.com

1975 births
Living people
People from Lørenskog
21st-century Norwegian singers
21st-century Norwegian women singers